In Greek mythology, Alistra was one of Poseidon's lovers who bore him Ogyges, an ancient Boeotian king.

Note 

Women of Poseidon
Mortal parents of demigods in classical mythology
Women in Greek mythology
Boeotian characters in Greek mythology